Nationality words link to articles with information on the nation's poetry or literature (for instance, Irish or France).

Works
 Bernardino Daniello, La poetica, criticism
 Anonymous, Jack Upland, publication year uncertain; misattributed to Geoffrey Chaucer
 Robert Copland, translation from the French of Robert de Balsac's, Le chemin de l'ospital, this poem is part of the "vagabond" literature of this period; the hospital referred to is St. Bartholomew's Hospital in London
 Lancelot de Carle, Épistre Contenant le Procès Criminel Faict à l'Encontre de la Royne Anne Boullant d'Angleterre (A Letter Containing the Criminal Charges Laid Against Queen Anne Boleyn of England), published 1545
 Clément Marot, Psaumes, translation of the Psalms from the Bible into French
 Aonio Paleario, De immortalitate animarum

Births
Death years link to the corresponding "[year] in poetry" article:
  Jeong Cheol, who wrote under the pen names "Gyeham" and "Songgang" (died 1593), Korean statesman and poet
 Thomas Sackville, 1st Earl of Dorset (died 1608), English statesman and poet
 Jean Vauquelin de la Fresnaye, 1606, French
 Dinko Ranjina (died 1607), Croatian
 Scévole de Sainte-Marthe (died 1623), French poet

Deaths
Birth years link to the corresponding "[year] in poetry" article:
 March 1 – Bernardo Accolti (born 1465), Italian
October 14 – Garcilaso de la Vega (born 1501) Spanish soldier and poet
 Also:
 Giannantonio Flaminio (born 1464), Italian, Latin-language poet
 Cecilia Gallerani (born 1473), Italian, Latin-language poet, a mistress of Ludovico Sforza
 Garcia de Resende (born c. 1470), Portuguese
 Johannes Secundus (born 1511), Dutch or German, Latin-language poet
 Gil Vicente, died about this year (born c. 1465), Portuguese poet and playwright

See also

 Poetry
 16th century in poetry
 16th century in literature
 Dutch Renaissance and Golden Age literature
 French Renaissance literature
 Renaissance literature
 Spanish Renaissance literature

Notes

16th-century poetry
Poetry